Michael Ian Coleridge Clarke (21 September 1913 – 10 November 1982) was a Barbadian cricketer. Clarke was a right-handed batsman who bowled right-arm fast-medium. He was born in Strathclyde in Saint Michael, Barbados.

A member of Spartan Cricket Club, Clarke played two matches for the Barbados national cricket team against Trinidad and Tobago in 1941. In his debut first-class cricket match, he made a century—153, finally dismissed by Trinidad leg spin bowler Rupert Tang Choon. His second match was played four days later and despite another creditable effort—42 runs in the first innings—he would never play for Barbados again.

References

1913 births
1982 deaths
Barbadian cricketers
Barbados cricketers